A bibliometrician is a researcher or a specialist in bibliometrics. It is near-synonymous with an informetrican (who studies informetrics), a scientometrican (who study scientometrics) and a webometrician, who study webometrics.

Notable bibliometricians
 Christine L. Borgman
 Samuel C. Bradford
 Blaise Cronin
 Margaret Elizabeth Egan
 Eugene Garfield (developer of the Science Citation Index and the Impact factor)
 Jorge E. Hirsch (developer of the h-index)
 Alfred J. Lotka
 M. H. MacRoberts
 B. R. MacRoberts
 Henk F. Moed
 Vasily Nalimov
 Per Ottar Seglen
 Derek J. de Solla Price
 Ronald Rousseau
 George Kingsley Zipf

See also
Institute for Scientific Information
International Society for Scientometrics and Informetrics (an association of professionals in the fields).

Information science